Miguel Fernández (born 10 April 1962) is an Argentinian professional golfer.

Fernández was born in Resistencia, Chaco. He worked as a caddie in Chaco, before turning professional in 1980.

Fernández won the Argentine Tour Order of Merit in 1987. He won the Argentine Open in 1987 and 1988, having previously finished second in 1986. In addition to several victories on the Tour de las Americas, he has also been second in the TLA Players Championship in 2003 and 2006.

Fernández played on the European Tour in 1991, finishing 131st on the Order of Merit with a best finish of tied 7th in the Open de Baleares. The same year, he also played in the British Open at Birkdale. Victory in the Panama Masters in 2004, gave him the chance to return to Europe to play on the Challenge Tour. However, he did not manage to repeat that performance, as he failed to register another top 30 finish on his way to 75th on the money list.

Fernández represented Argentina on one occasion in the World Cup, in 1989 in Spain, and came 4th in the individual tournament.

Professional wins (16)

Challenge Tour wins (1)

1Co-sanctioned by the Tour de las Américas

Challenge Tour playoff record (1–0)

Tour de las Américas wins (2)
2004 Panama Masters (Co-sanctioned by the Challenge Tour)
2005 Brazil Classic

Argentine wins (12)
1987 Argentine Open, Center Open, Abierto del Litoral
1988 Argentine Open, Abierto del Litoral
1990 North Open
1992 Boulonge Four Ball (with Rubén Alvarez)
1993 Nautico Escobar Grand Prix
1997 Norpatagonico Open
2002 Carilo Open
2005 Parana Open
2006 Chaco Open

Other wins (2)
1993 Prince of Wales Open (Chile)
1996 Uruguay Open

Team appearances
Dunhill Cup (representing Argentina): 1989
World Cup (representing Argentina): 1989

External links

Argentine male golfers
European Tour golfers
Sportspeople from Chaco Province
People from Resistencia, Chaco
1962 births
Living people